Yenifer Padilla González (also spelled ; born 1 January 1990) is a Colombian track and field athlete who competes in the 200 metres and 400 metres sprint events.  Her first name is also spelled Yenifer of Yennifer.

She won the 400 m title at the 2011 Olimpic Games as well as two bronze medals in the relay for Colombia. She set her 400 m personal best of 51.53 seconds at the competition.

Padilla was a medallist in the individual and relay sprinting events at the South American Championships in Athletics in both 2009 and 2011. She jointly holds the Colombian record for the 4×400 m relay with a time of 3:29.94 minutes.

Career
Born in Quibdó, Chocó Department, she won the Colombian youth title over 200 m in 2007 and made her first international appearances two years later. At the age of nineteen she won her first senior medals, taking the 200 m bronze at the 2009 South American Championships in Athletics and sharing in the 4×400 metres relay silver with the Colombian team. Although the 2009 South American Junior Athletics Championships was for younger athletes, she repeated the same placings in both the 200 m and 4×100 m relay events. A week later she ran at the 2009 Pan American Junior Championships in Athletics. She came sixth in the 200 m but demonstrated her strength in the 400 metres sprint by winning the gold medal in a time of 53.60 seconds. Her fourth and final international outing of the year came at the 2009 Bolivarian Games and she won the 400 m silver and 400 m relay gold medals.

She began the next season with appearances at the 2010 South American Games, at which she won the 400 m silver medal, came fourth in the 200 m, and ran in both the 100 m and 400 m relay events for Colombia, helping the team to second and first place, respectively. In June she ran at the 2010 Ibero-American Championships in Athletics and claimed the 400 m silver medal behind Cuba's Daisurami Bonne. She was less successful individually at July's 2010 Central American and Caribbean Games, being eliminated in the heats, but she managed to aid Colombia to second place in the 4×400 m relay with Alejandra Idrovo, Darlenis Obregón and Norma González.

Returning to the continental competition, she was the runner-up in both 400 m individual and relay events at the 2011 South American Championships in Athletics. She ran a 400 m personal best of 51.59 seconds in Cali then placed fifth at the competitive 2011 CAC Championships. The high altitude conditions at the 2011 Pan American Games in Guadalajara saw Padilla run a personal best of 51.76 seconds in the heats then another best of 51.53 seconds in the final – a time which brought her the gold medal and made her the first South American woman to win the 400 m Pan American title. She went on to claim two further medals in athletics for Colombia at the games, first helping the 4×100 m relay team to the bronze medal, then anchoring Colombia's 4×400 m relay to a second bronze and a Colombian record mark of 3:29.94 minutes.

She represented her country at the 2012 London Olympics, but was disqualified in her heat. She had success at the 2012 South American Under-23 Championships in Athletics, taking the 400 m title, a 100 m relay silver medal, and fourth place in the 200 m.

Personal bests
100 m: 11.70 A (wind: NWI) –  Medellín, 5 March 2010
200 m: 23.32 (wind: +0.1 m/s) –  cali, noviembre 2015
400 m: 51.53 –  Guadalajara, 26 October 2011

International competitions

References

External links
 
 

1990 births
Living people
Athletes (track and field) at the 2011 Pan American Games
Athletes (track and field) at the 2019 Pan American Games
People from Quibdó
Colombian female sprinters
Athletes (track and field) at the 2012 Summer Olympics
Olympic athletes of Colombia
Pan American Games gold medalists for Colombia
Pan American Games bronze medalists for Colombia
Pan American Games medalists in athletics (track and field)
Athletes (track and field) at the 2018 South American Games
South American Games gold medalists for Colombia
South American Games silver medalists for Colombia
South American Games bronze medalists for Colombia
South American Games medalists in athletics
Central American and Caribbean Games gold medalists for Colombia
Central American and Caribbean Games silver medalists for Colombia
Central American and Caribbean Games bronze medalists for Colombia
Competitors at the 2010 Central American and Caribbean Games
Competitors at the 2014 Central American and Caribbean Games
Competitors at the 2018 Central American and Caribbean Games
Central American and Caribbean Games medalists in athletics
Medalists at the 2011 Pan American Games
South American Games gold medalists in athletics
Olympic female sprinters
Sportspeople from Chocó Department
21st-century Colombian women